Ivan Taranov is the name of:

Ivan Taranov (footballer) (born 1986), Russian footballer
Ivan Taranov (racing driver) (born 1994), Russian racing driver